Alfonso Carrillo de Albornoz (also Alonso Carrillo de Albornoz) (died 14 June 1514) was a Roman Catholic prelate who served as Bishop of Ávila (1496–1498) 
and Bishop of Catania (1486–1496).

Biography
On 8 November 1486, Alfonso Carrillo de Albornoz was selected by the King of Spain and confirmed by Pope Innocent VIII as Bishop of Catania. 
On 27 June 1496, he was appointed by Pope Alexander VI as Bishop of Ávila.
He served as Bishop of Ávila until his death on 14 June 1514.

References

External links and additional sources
 (for Chronology of Bishops) 
 (for Chronology of Bishops) 
 (for Chronology of Bishops) 
 (for Chronology of Bishops) 

1514 deaths
15th-century Roman Catholic bishops in the Kingdom of Aragon
Bishops appointed by Pope Innocent VIII
Bishops appointed by Pope Alexander VI
15th-century Roman Catholic bishops in Sicily